Amity Township is located in Livingston County, Illinois. As of the 2010 census, its population was 866 and it contained 376 housing units.

Geography

Demographics

Cemeteries
Bayou Cemetery is located southwest of Cornell, just southeast of the intersection of the Bayou and the Vermilion River in section 22.

History
The first Europeans to settle the area that would eventually become Amity Township were Thomas N. Reynolds, Samuel K. Reynolds, and E. Breckinridge, arriving together in 1833.  The area was attractive to early settlers for its abundance of timber, stone, and water.  They built small cabins for their families and lived in them for several years on what was known by 1878 as the J.P. Houston farm.

The township may be named after Amity, Ohio.  This is very likely as the earliest settlers in the township were from Ohio.  It was mentioned in the same 1878 history that Amity means friendship.

The township was officially organized on April 6, 1858, and was one of the first 20 townships in Livingston County organized in 1858.

In 1871 a railroad was completed through the township.  That same year, on June 15, Walter B. Cornell laid out a plat in the SW corner of section 11 and called it Cornell.  2 days later, Willard D. Blake section 14 and called it Amity.  Most of the businesses were in Amity, but in 1873, the village organized as Cornell.

References

External links
US Census
City-data.com
Illinois State Archives

Townships in Livingston County, Illinois
Populated places established in 1857
Townships in Illinois
1857 establishments in Illinois